Austria competed at the 1973 World Aquatics Championships in Belgrade, Yugoslavia from August 31 to September 9.

Diving

References

Competition results

World Aquatics Championships
Nations at the 1973 World Aquatics Championships
1973